Diadsomaspis is an extinct genus of placoderm fish, which lived during the Late Devonian period in Europe.

References

Placoderms of Europe
Phlyctaeniidae
Prehistoric life of Europe